The palm tanager (Thraupis palmarum) is a medium-sized passerine bird. This tanager is a resident breeder from Nicaragua south to Bolivia, Paraguay and southern Brazil. It also breeds on Trinidad and, since 1962, on Tobago. In Trinidad and Tobago, it is known by colloquial names such as the "palmiste" on American Spanish countries (Colombian pronn: "pūlmist"), Brazil Pipira-verde (Portuguese pron: "pəəpəərā-værd") and the "green jean" in American English.

Description
They are grey to dull olive-green. The flight feathers are blackish, and the long tail is blackish edged with green. A yellow wingbar shows in flight. Sexes are similar, although females may be somewhat paler.

Range and habitat
It occurs in semi-open areas including cultivation and gardens. The bulky cup nest is built in a tree, usually a palm, or under the eaves of a house, and the female incubates three, sometimes two, brown-blotched cream eggs for 14 days, with another 17 days to fledging.

Behavior
Palm tanagers are social, restless but unwary birds which eat a wide variety of small fruit. They also regularly take some nectar and insects, including caterpillars. The song is fast and squeaky.

References

External links

 
 
 Palm tanager Photos at Smithsonian Migratory Bird Center
 
 
 
 

palm tanager
Birds of the Amazon Basin
Birds of the Guianas
Birds of Colombia
Birds of Venezuela
Birds of Ecuador
Birds of Brazil
Birds of Trinidad and Tobago
Birds of Nicaragua
Birds of Costa Rica
Birds of Panama
palm tanager
Taxobox binomials not recognized by IUCN